The Pyramid Club is a nightclub in the East Village of Manhattan, New York City. After opening in 1979, the Pyramid helped define the East Village drag, gay, punk and art scenes of the 1980s. The club is located at 101 Avenue A in Manhattan.

History 

In the '70s and '80s the club became a hangout for "a new breed of politicized drag performers" like Lypsinka, Lady Bunny, and RuPaul, whose first New York City show was at the Pyramid Club in 1982 . On Labor Day 1985, Pyramid performer Lady Bunny hosted the Wigstock Festival in Tompkins Square Park. Andy Warhol and Debbie Harry dropped in the Pyramid to do a feature on the club for MTV, and Madonna appeared at her first AIDS benefit at the club. Both Nirvana and Red Hot Chili Peppers played their first New York City concerts there. From 1992–95, Blacklips Performance Cult, a collective founded by ANOHNI, presented plays at Pyramid every Monday at midnight. Keith Haring was also a frequent patron.

In 2007, it was proposed that 101 Avenue A, the Pyramid Club's building, be landmarked. The proposal, described as the first "drag landmark", was not adopted by the New York City Landmarks Preservation Commission (LPC). However, in the spring of 2011 the LPC proposed a new historic district in the East Village focused around lower Second Avenue and encompassing 15 blocks and 330 buildings. The original proposal excluded buildings such as the Pyramid Club, but because of efforts made by local community groups, the proposed district was expanded to  101 Avenue A as well as other similar buildings. The LPC designated the club as part of the East Village/Lower East Side Historic District on October 9, 2012.

Notable performers 

 Babes in Toyland
 Book of Love
 Butthole Surfers
 Chris & Cosey
 Country Joe & the Fish
 Jayne County
 Johanna Went
 Deee-Lite
 Debbie Harry
 Figures on a Beach
 The Flaming Lips
 The Frogs
 GWAR
 Richard Hell
 The Hillbilly Peckers
 International Chrysis
 Dean Johnson
 Lady Bunny
 Liberty Belle and the Union Boys
 Rhys Chatham
 Lypsinka
 Madonna
 Taylor Mead
 Miss Understood
 Mudhoney
 Nico
 Nirvana
 Psychic TV
 Q Lazzarus
 Red Hot Chili Peppers
 RuPaul
 John Sex
 Sonic Youth
 Swans
 Tabboo
 The Voluptuous Horror of Karen Black
 They Might Be Giants
 Warrior Soul
 White Zombie
 Wendy Wild
 Meat Beat Manifesto
 Spahn Ranch

References

External links 
 History of the Pyramid Club 

Nightclubs in Manhattan
East Village, Manhattan
1979 establishments in New York City